The 2017 Chicago Red Stars season was the team's ninth season. The team competed in the National Women's Soccer League, the top tier of women's soccer in the United States. In 2017, for the third consecutive season, the Red Stars made it to the post-season playoffs and was eliminated in the semi-final.

First-team squad
The entire 2017 roster was returned for 2018 NWSL season.

Roster
Players who were under contract to play for the club in 2017 NWSL season.

2018 squad 
+ indicates player was added during the season, - indicates player was removed during the season.

College draft
Players selected by the club in 2017 NWSL College Draft.

Loan to W-League clubs
After the 2018 season several Chicago Red Stars players were loaned to clubs of W-League of Australia to play in their 2017-2018 season.

Management and staff
Front Office
 Owner Arnim Whisler
Coaching Staff
Manager Rory Dames
Assistant coach Bonnie Young
Assistant coach Brian Kibler
Assistant and Goalkeeper Coach Jordi King

Regular-season standings

League standing

Weekly ranking

Update June 1, 2018 Source: NWSL 2017 season

Results summary

Match results

Preseason

National Women's Soccer League

Regular season

Playoffs

Players statistics

Honors and awards

NWSL annual awards

NWSL Team of the Month

NWSL Goal of the Week

NWSL Save of the Week

References

Match reports (preseason)

Match reports (regular season)

Match report (postseason playoff)

Notes

External links 

 

2017
Chicago Red Stars
Chicago Red Stars
Chicago Red Stars